Daniel Dye (born December 4, 2003) is an American professional stock car racing driver. He competes full-time in the NASCAR Craftsman Truck Series, driving the No. 43 Chevrolet Silverado for GMS Racing.

Racing career

ARCA Menards Series East

2020–2021
Dye would first race in the ARCA Menards Series East in 2020, driving the No. 43 for Ben Kennedy Racing. Dye would race two races that season, retiring at New Smyrna Speedway and finishing seventh at Five Flags Speedway.

Dye would come back in the 2021 season, this time with a scheduled full-time ride with Ben Kennedy Racing. However, Dye would only compete for four of the scheduled eight races before eventually switching teams. For the last four races of the season, Dye would race the No. 21 for GMS Racing. Dye, combined with his results from Ben Kennedy Racing and GMS Racing, would finish second in the final standings, only being beaten by Sammy Smith.

ARCA Menards Series West

2021–2022
Dye would first race in the ARCA Menards Series West as a one-off race at Phoenix Raceway, driving the No. 22 for GMS Racing in 2021, he would finish 12th. In 2022, he ran at Phoenix again in a companion event with the ARCA Menards Series, finishing second.

ARCA Menards Series

2021
Dye would run a part-time schedule in the ARCA Menards Series in 2021 with GMS Racing, driving the No. 21 along with his full-time schedule in the ARCA Menards Series East. He would run six races in the 2021 season. After a seventh-place finish in his debut at the 2021 Menards 250, Dye would dominate the next race at Berlin Raceway in the 2021 Zinsser SmartCoat 200, scoring his first-ever ARCA Menards Series win in just his second-ever start in the series.

2022
In 2022, he planned to run a full-time schedule for GMS Racing in the No. 43. However, he was indefinitely suspended from ARCA competition after three races. Prior to the race at the Kansas Speedway, Dye was reinstated by ARCA after his charges were dropped from felony to misdemeanor and went on to compete in the event, finishing 3rd. Despite not winning a race, he nearly won the Championship until a mechanical issue relegated him to an 18th-place finish at the season finale in Toledo, which resulted in a runner-up to Nick Sanchez by 14 points in the final standings. Despite this, he won Rookie of the Year honors ahead of Sanchez's teammate Rajah Caruth.

NASCAR Craftsman Truck Series
On October 25, 2022, GMS Racing announced that Dye would compete full time in the 2023 NASCAR Craftsman Truck Series, making his series debut in the No. 43 Chevrolet Silverado.

Personal life
Dye is a second-generation driver, the son of former Pro Late Model driver Randy Dye who since July 2017 has served on the board of directors for The NASCAR Foundation. He is a cousin of MLB player for the Kansas City Royals, Josh Dye.

Dye currently attends Father Lopez Catholic High School. He was arrested on April 26, 2022 and booked in Volusia County, Florida on charges of Felony Battery. According to a police report, he had punched a fellow student at his high school in the testicles, with the victim suffering "a possible ruptured testicle..." ARCA would indefinitely suspend him after the arrest. On May 13, 2022, one day before the Dutch Boy 150 ARCA race at Kansas, Dye released a statement confirming he had been reinstated by ARCA following the reduction of his felony charge to a misdemeanor by a Florida state attorney. In the statement, Dye admitted the incident stemmed from a "silly and admittedly immature game commonly played at the school between boys and involves hitting each other in the groin area" and that there was no malicious intent involved.

Philanthropy
At the end of 2018 with his Pro Late Model debut on the horizon he created the Race to Stop Suicide campaign in partnership with The NASCAR Foundation and Halifax Health with help from his father Randy who serves on the board of directors for The NASCAR Foundation.

In October 2019 at only 15-years-old, Dye himself raised and donated over $15,000 towards Halifax Health’s mental health programs.

Motorsports career results

NASCAR
(key) (Bold – Pole position awarded by qualifying time. Italics – Pole position earned by points standings or practice time. * – Most laps led.)

Craftsman Truck Series

 Season still in progress
 Ineligible for series points

ARCA Menards Series
(key) (Bold – Pole position awarded by qualifying time. Italics – Pole position earned by points standings or practice time. * – Most laps led.)

ARCA Menards Series East

ARCA Menards Series West

References

External links
 
 Official profile at GMS Racing
 

2003 births
Living people
ARCA Menards Series drivers
NASCAR drivers
Racing drivers from Florida
Sportspeople from Florida
People charged with battery